The melting pot is an analogy for the way in which heterogeneous societies become more homogeneous.

Melting pot may also refer to:

 Crucible, a container in which materials can be heated to very high temperatures
 The Melting Pot (restaurant), an American chain of fondue restaurants

In media
 Melting Pot (film), a 1998 film starring Paul Rodriguez
 Melting Pot (The Charlatans album), 1998
 Melting Pot (Booker T album), 1971, or the title song
 Melting Pot (Zoe Rahman album), 2006
 The Melting Pot (TV series), a 1975 sitcom
 "Melting Pot" (song), a 1969 song by Blue Mink
 "Melting Pot", a 1996 song by Boyzone from A Different Beat
 "Melting Pot", a 2004 song by Pitbull featuring Trick Daddy from M.I.A.M.I.
 The Melting Pot (play), a 1908 play by Israel Zangwill
 The Melting Pot, an American socialist journal (published 1913–1920) edited by Henry M. Tichenor
 The Melting Pot (comics), a 1995 graphic novel by Kevin Eastman, Simon Bisley and Eric Talbot
 The Melting Pot (film), a lost 1915 silent film drama

See also
 Crucible (disambiguation)